The Schijen is a mountain of the Glarus Alps in Switzerland, located west of the Ortstock. The summit is the tripoint between the cantons of Schwyz, Uri and Glarus. The Schijen lies on the range that lies between the Glattalp and the Urner Boden.

References

External links
 Schijen on Hikr

Mountains of the Alps
Mountains of Switzerland
Mountains of the canton of Schwyz
Mountains of the canton of Uri
Mountains of the canton of Glarus
Schwyz–Uri border
Glarus–Schwyz border
Glarus–Uri border